Pogonistes is a genus of ground beetles in the family Carabidae. There are about eight described species in Pogonistes.

Species
These eight species belong to the genus Pogonistes:
 Pogonistes angustus (Gebler, 1830)  (Europe & Northern Asia (excluding China))
 Pogonistes chinensis Habu, 1986  (China)
 Pogonistes convexicollis Chaudoir, 1872  (Palearctic)
 Pogonistes gracilis (Dejean, 1828)  Mediterranean)
 Pogonistes grinevi Lutshnik, 1935  (Russia)
 Pogonistes liliputanus (Apfelbeck, 1904)  (Greece and Turkey)
 Pogonistes rufoaeneus (Dejean, 1828)  (Palearctic)
 Pogonistes testaceus (Dejean, 1828)  (Europe and southwest Asia)

References

Trechinae